The Microinsurance Centre was created in 2000 by Michael J. McCord.  It is as an independent institution dedicated to promoting responsible microinsurance, with their focus on the partner-agent model.  The partner-agent model links microinsurance schemes (hosted primarily by MFIs) to established commercial insurance companies.  This link allows the risk of the schemes to remain with the insurer, and thereby can enable greater sustainability and long-term viability.

The Microinsurance Centre works on two fronts, helping to establish proper dialogue on micro-insurance policies and helping to set up proper microinsurance schemes.  They have a wide range of partners that they work with, including insurers, regulators, donors, MFIs, and NGOs.  They have played a role in projects in numerous countries that include Uganda, Kenya, Ghana, India, Nepal, Jordan, Peru, Laos, and Indonesia.  They are also actively involved in disseminating information on micro-insurance through their periodic Briefing Notes, web site, and speaking engagements.  In addition, they have conducted several country case studies and held trainings in Italy, Uganda, and Pakistan.

External links 
 

Microfinance organizations
Organizations established in 2000
Insurance agents
Microinsurance